Karel Doorman class are classes of which the lead ships are named after Dutch naval mariner Karel Doorman.

''Karel Doorman'' class may refer to: